Zoosphaerium is a genus of giant pill millipedes endemic to Madagascar. Some species within this genus express island gigantism. The largest of the known species of giant pill millipede known is Zoosphaerium neptunus, which is capable of growing to lengths of 90 mm (3.5 in).

Distribution and habitat 
Zoosphaerium is restricted to the island of Madagascar. Madagascar is a hotspot for biodiversity and localized endemism, as a result some species occur sympatrically as microendemics. Species within the genus Zoosphaerium  can be found living amongst damp leaf litter in forest and jungle habitats.

Species List 
Below is a list of all 74 known species:

Zoosphaerium actaeon (White, 1859)

Zoosphaerium album Wesener, 2009

Zoosphaerium alluaudi (De Saussure & Zehntner, 1902)

Zoosphaerium amabile Wesener, 2009

Zoosphaerium ambatovaky Wesener & Sagorny, 2021

Zoosphaerium ambrense Wesener, 2009

Zoosphaerium analavelona Wesener, 2009

Zoosphaerium anale (De Saussure & Zehntner, 1897)

Zoosphaerium anomalum (De Saussure & Zehntner, 1902)

Zoosphaerium arborealis Wesener & Sierwald, 2005

Zoosphaerium aureum Wesener, 2009

Zoosphaerium bambusoides Wesener & Bespalova, 2010

Zoosphaerium bemanevika Sagorny & Wesener, 2017

Zoosphaerium bilobum Wesener, 2009

Zoosphaerium blandum (De Saussure & Zehntner, 1902)

Zoosphaerium broelemanni Wesener, 2009

Zoosphaerium campanulatum (De Saussure & Zehntner, 1902)

Zoosphaerium coquerelianum (De Saussure & Zehntner, 1902)

Zoosphaerium corystoides Wesener, 2009

Zoosphaerium crassum (Butler, 1878)

Zoosphaerium darthvaderi Wesener & Bespalova, 2010

Zoosphaerium denticulatum Wesener, 2009

Zoosphaerium discolor Wesener, 2009

Zoosphaerium elegans (Lenz, 1881)

Zoosphaerium endemicum Wesener, 2009

Zoosphaerium fisheri Wesener, 2009

Zoosphaerium fraternarium Jeekel, 1999

Zoosphaerium glabrum (Butler, 1873)

Zoosphaerium haackeri Wesener, 2009

Zoosphaerium heleios Wesener & Bespalova, 2010

Zoosphaerium hippocastanum (Gervais, 1847)

Zoosphaerium ignotum Wesener, 2009

Zoosphaerium immane (Karsch, 1881)

Zoosphaerium isalo Wesener, 2009

Zoosphaerium lambertoni (Brolemann, 1922)

Zoosphaerium lamprinum (Butler, 1878)

Zoosphaerium latum (Butler, 1872)

Zoosphaerium libidinosum (De Saussure & Zehntner, 1897)

Zoosphaerium masoala Wesener & Sagorny, 2021

Zoosphaerium micropilligerum Wesener, 2009

Zoosphaerium minutus Sagorny & Wesener, 2017

Zoosphaerium mitoho Wesener, 2009

Zoosphaerium muscorum Wesener & Bespalova, 2010

Zoosphaerium neptunus (Butler, 1872)

Zoosphaerium nigrum Wesener & Sagorny, 2021

Zoosphaerium piligerum (De Saussure & Zehntner, 1897)

Zoosphaerium platylabum (De Saussure & Zehntner, 1897)

Zoosphaerium priapus (De Saussure & Zehntner, 1897)

Zoosphaerium pseudoblandum Wesener, 2009

Zoosphaerium pseudopiligerum Wesener, 2009

Zoosphaerium pseudoplatylabum Wesener, 2009

Zoosphaerium pseudopriapus Wesener, 2009

Zoosphaerium pulchellum Wesener, 2009

Zoosphaerium pygidiale (De Saussure & Zehntner, 1902)

Zoosphaerium reflexum (Brolemann, 1922)

Zoosphaerium reticulatum (Butler, 1878)

Zoosphaerium sakanum (Attems, 1910)

Zoosphaerium silens Wesener & Sagorny, 2021

Zoosphaerium smaragdinum Wesener, 2009

Zoosphaerium solitarium Wesener, 2009

Zoosphaerium spinopiligerum Wesener & Sagorny, 2021

Zoosphaerium stigmaticum (Butler, 1873)

Zoosphaerium subreflexum Jeekel, 1999

Zoosphaerium tainkintana Wesener, 2009

Zoosphaerium tampolo Wesener, 2009

Zoosphaerium testaceum (Olivier, 1792)

Zoosphaerium tigrioculatum Wesener & Bespalova, 2010

Zoosphaerium trichordum Wesener, 2009

Zoosphaerium tsingy Wesener, 2009

Zoosphaerium villosum Wesener & Sierwald, 2005

Zoosphaerium viridissimum Wesener, 2009

Zoosphaerium voahangy Wesener & Sagorny, 2021

Zoosphaerium voeltzkowianum (De Saussure & Zehntner, 1901)

Zoosphaerium xerophilum Wesener, 2009

References

Millipedes of Africa
Sphaerotheriida
Millipede genera
Endemic fauna of Madagascar
Arthropods of Madagascar